de Michelis (or alternate spellings Demichelis, Demicheli) may refer to:

 Cesare G. De Michelis, professor of Russian literature at the University of Rome
 Elizabeth De Michelis, scholar of modern yoga
 Gianni De Michelis, Italian politician
 Martín Demichelis, Argentine footballer
 Alberto Demicheli, Uruguayan politician
 Tulio Demicheli, Argentine film director
 Sofía Álvarez Vignoli de Demicheli, First Lady of Uruguay

Italian-language surnames
Patronymic surnames
Surnames from given names